Onomacritus is a genus of cicadas in the family Cicadidae. There is at least one described species in Onomacritus, O. sumatranus.

References

Further reading

 
 
 
 

Leptopsaltriini
Cicadidae genera